is a voice actress and singer from Japan. She is affiliated with the talent agency Hibiki.

Early life
Aiba was born in Hokkaido but raised in Osaka. She went and graduated from Amusement Media Voice Actor Talent Academy in 2010.

Career
Before becoming a seiyuu, she was a professional wrestler under the name Yuuki Harima (播磨佑紀) for about two years, and also worked as a stage actress with the same name. During her pro wrestling career, she was part of the organization "Beginning" and made her debut on September 6, 2015. She fought three times before retiring from the ring, and nowadays does MC work for New Japan Pro-Wrestling's matches.

Aiba debuted in voice acting by providing the voice of Tokoha Anjou in Cardfight!! Vanguard G: NEXT, replacing Nitta Emi. In 2017, she began voicing and performing in the franchise BanG Dream! as Yukina Minato of the band Roselia.

She made her professional singing debut from Bushiroad Music in November 2016 with her first st single "Yume no Hikari Kimi no Mirai", which was used as the ending theme for Future Card Buddyfight DDD. She restarted her solo singing career with the single "Lead the way", which was released on October 16, 2019. It was used as the opening theme for the anime Cardfight!! Vanguard: Shinemon.

On March 3, 2018, Aiba, who was a member of the unit Doubutsu Biscuits x PPP, was one of the winners of the Singing Award during the 12th Seiyu Awards. In 2020, she and Roselia received the Singing Award at the 14th Seiyu Awards.

Filmography

Anime
2016
Cardfight!! Vanguard G: Next – Tokoha Anjou

2017
BanG Dream! – Yukina Minato
Kemono Friends – Iwatobi Penguin
Cardfight!! Vanguard G: Z – Tokoha Anjou

2018
BanG Dream! Girls Band Party! Pico – Yukina Minato
Shōjo Kageki Revue Starlight – Claudine Saijō

2019
BanG Dream! 2nd Season – Yukina Minato
BanG Dream! Film Live – Yukina Minato

2020
BanG Dream! 3rd Season – Yukina Minato
BanG Dream! Girls Band Party! Pico: Ohmori – Yukina Minato

2021
BanG Dream! Episode of Roselia (Yakusoku and Song I am.) – Yukina Minato
BanG Dream! Film Live 2nd Stage – Yukina Minato
BanG Dream! Girls Band Party! Pico Fever! – Yukina Minato
D Cide Traumerei – Maria Nanase
PuraOre! Pride of Orange – Seiko Kuga

2022
Teppen!!!!!!!!!!!!!!! Laughing 'til You Cry – Chitose Amano

2023
Sorcerous Stabber Orphen: Chaos in Urbanrama – Winona

Games
 BanG Dream! Girls Band Party! – Yukina Minato
 Brown Dust – Eunrang
 Revue Starlight: Re LIVE – Claudine Saijō

Radio
 Radio Vanguard G NEXT (2016–2017)

Dubbing
 The Last Summoner (2023) – Hana

Discography

Mini-albums

Singles

References

External links
 

1988 births
Japanese voice actresses
Living people
People from Osaka Prefecture
Musicians from Osaka Prefecture
Japanese women pop singers
21st-century Japanese actresses
21st-century Japanese singers
21st-century Japanese women singers
Starlight 99-gumi members